Glomosporium is a genus of fungi belonging to the family Glomosporiaceae.

The genus was first described by Kochman in 1939.

The genus has cosmopolitan distribution.

Species:
 Glomosporium leptideum (Syd. & P.Syd.) Kochman

References

Ustilaginomycotina
Basidiomycota genera